Krutishka is a rural locality (a selo) and the administrative center of Krutishinsky Selsoviet, Shelabolikhinsky District, Altai Krai, Russia. The population was 1,046 as of 2013. There are 15 streets.

Geography 
Krutishka is located 58 km west of Shelabolikha (the district's administrative centre) by road. Chaykino is the nearest rural locality.

References 

Rural localities in Shelabolikhinsky District